This is an alphabetical list of villages in Purba Bardhaman district, West Bengal, India.

A–C 

 Adrahati
 Amarpur
 Amarun
 Ambana
 Amgoria
 Amrargar
 Amur
 Aogram
 Arjjunpur
 Arra
 Atgharia
 Ausgram

B 

 Badla
 Badulia
 Bagabanpur
 Bagbati
 Baidyapur
 Balgana
 Balgona
 Balsidanga
 Bamshore
 Bamunapara
 Bamunara
 Bankapasi
 Banpash
 Bara Belun
 Barshul
 Belenda
 Bharatpur
 Bhatakul
 Bhatar
 Bhimsara
 Bhuyera
 Bigra
 Bononabagram

C–F 

 Chak Khandajuli
 Chak Tentul
 Chandra
 Chandrapur
 Channa village
 Debipur
 Dharmapura
 Dwariapur
 Erachya
 Fatepur

G–J 

 Galsi
 Gangatikuri
 Ghagra
 Ghanshyampur
 Gholada
 Gonna Serandi
 Gotan
 Gramdihi
 Hanrgram
 Haribati
 Hasanhati
 Hatgobindapur
 Jajigram
 Jamalpur
 Jamtara
 Jhamatpur
 Jharul
 Jhikardanga
 Jhujkadanga

K 
* Kachgaria
 Kaigram
 Kamargoria
 Kamnara
 Kandorsona
 Kandra
 Karjjana
 Karui
 Kasba
 Ketugram
 Khandaghosh
 Kherur
 Kogram
 Kondaipur
 Kora
 Korakdal
 Kshirgram
 Kuara
 Kulingram
 Kumarun
 Kumirkola
 Kurmun
 Kusumgram

L–N 

 Lakhuria
 Madhabdihi
 Mahata
 Maheshbati
 Majida
 Majigram
 Mankar
 Masagram
 Mongalkote
 Monteswar
 Muidhara
 Nabagram
 Nadanghat
 Narayanpur
 Narjja
 Nasigram
 Nityanandapur
 Nutanhat

O–R 

 Orgram
 Pahalanpur
 Paharhati
 Palitpur
 Panchkula
 Parulia
 Patuli
 Purbasthali
 Pursha
 Putsuri
 Raina
 Rajipur
 Ramchandrapur
 Ramgopalpur
 Randiha
 Rangapara
 Rasulpur
 Ratanpur
 Routhgram

S 

 Sagrai
 Salkuni
 Salun
 Samudragarh
 Sankari
 Santoshpur
 Selenda
 Shillya
 Shunur
 Shyamsundar
 Silakot
 Singarkone
 Singot
 Sodepur
 Sonchalida
 Sotkhali
 Sribati
 Srikhanda
 Sujapur
 Sundalpur

T–Z 

 Tulsidanga
 Uchalan
 Uchchagram
 Udaypur
 Uddharanpur
 Ukhrid
 Usha

Purba Bardhaman district